Angelfish was a short-lived early-1990s Scottish alternative rock group originating from Edinburgh, Scotland, formed as a side-project to Scottish group Goodbye Mr Mackenzie, after keyboardist and backing vocalist Shirley Manson was signed as a solo artist to circumvent the Mackenzies' existing record contract. Angelfish released a single self-titled studio album, Angelfish, and two singles of which the first was an EP for minor college radio hit "Suffocate Me".

The music video for "Suffocate Me" was aired once by MTV during 120 Minutes, where it was seen by Garbage co-founder Steve Marker.  Manson was asked to join Garbage and accepted. The Angelfish side-project was dissolved, while Goodbye Mr Mackenzie continued for another two years without Manson.

Discography

Albums

Singles and EPs

References

External links
 Official Website Goodbye Mr. Mackenzie & Angelfish
 Angelfish on MySpace

Scottish rock music groups
Musical groups established in 1992
Musical groups disestablished in 1994
Scottish alternative rock groups
Dream pop musical groups
1991 establishments in Scotland